Elyaniv Barda (or Elianiv, ; born 15 December 1981) is an Israeli former football forward and winger, And the current manager of Hapoel Be'er Sheva. His former clubs include Hapoel Be'er Sheva, Maccabi Haifa, Hapoel Tel Aviv and Belgian side Racing Genk, with whom he won four trophies during a successful six-year spell. Bards is considered by many to be Hapoel Be’er Sheva’s biggest player of all time.

Early life
Barda was born in Beer Sheva, Israel, to a Tunisian-Jewish family.

Club career

Hapoel Be'er Sheva
Barda began through the youth ranks of his hometown team, Hapoel Be'er Sheva, and then the first team. Between 1998 and 2002, which included seasons in both the Israeli Premier League and the second division, he scored 19 goals in 78 matches.

Maccabi Haifa
In 2003, Barda was sold to Israeli champions Maccabi Haifa despite the promises made by the club’s owners to not sell him. At Maccabi Haifa, Barda played in the championship winning teams of 2003–04 and 2004–05. In two seasons at Maccabi Haifa, the forward scored 12 goals in 63 appearances.

Hapoel Tel Aviv
On the eve of the 2005–06 Israeli season, Barda, along with Haifa teammate Walid Badir, was signed by Hapoel Tel Aviv. Barda played 62 matches for Hapoel Tel Aviv, scoring on 17 occasions. He also scored 3 goals in Hapoel's successful 2006–07 UEFA Cup campaign, where the Israeli team progressed past the group stages. Barda won silverware at Hapoel when he was a member of two Israel State Cup winning sides; in the 2005–06 season and the 2006–07 season.

Racing Genk
On 22 June 2007, Barda was signed by Belgian side Racing Genk on a three-year contract, with the transfer fee believed to be in the region of €90,000. He had earlier failed to agree a move to Cypriot club APOEL F.C. In his first season at Genk in 2007/08, he scored 16 goals in 32 appearances, finishing as the second highest goalscorer in the league. This included a hat-trick against Zulte-Waregem in a 5–2 victory.

Barda, known for his versatility and pace in the early stages of his career in Belgium, was often employed as a lone striker in his first season at Genk, linking up well with midfield but still scoring and assisting to goals.

On 6 January 2009, despite interest from Scottish club Celtic, and Dutch clubs FC Twente and SC Heerenveen, the Israeli forward signed a new four-and-a-half year deal that would keep him at Genk until June 2013.

Barda's second season at Genk was marred by injuries. He featured in just 25 league matches and contributed 5 league goals, plus another goal during the semi-finals of the Belgian Cup. On 23 May 2009, Genk defeated K.V. Mechelen 2–0 in the Cup final, securing a berth in the play-off round of the UEFA Europa League 2009–10. In this match, Barda provided the assist for the first goal of the match.

The coming of age of young attacking players such as Jelle Vossen, Christian Benteke and Kevin De Bruyne, as well as the expensive purchase of the popular Genk-born Benji De Ceulaer saw Barda increasingly being used as a substitute during the final two years of his Genk career. However, he remained an influential figure on the pitch, often scoring important goals when coming off the bench and tilting the momentum in Genk's favour because of his intelligent and determined playing style.

On 21 May 2013, Genk announced that negotiations with the player would not continue after both parties failed to agree terms on a contract extension.

During six years at the club, Barda made 196 appearances in all club competitions, scored 67 goals and provided 50 assists. He also holds Genk's record for most goals scored by a foreign player.

Return to Hapoel Be'er Sheva
After his spell in Belgium, Barda returned to Israel. On 25 June 2013 he signed a three-year contract at his hometown club Hapoel Be'er Sheva, where he started his professional career. He signed for Be’er Sheva just months after the team managed to avoid relegation in the final game of the season. His comeback to his childhood team is considered remarkable and historic, and it completely changed Hapoel Be’er Sheva’s history. Barda was a key player in his first 2 seasons, Scored 18 league goals and paced the way for high profile players to join Be’er Sheva, but saw his team finish 2nd and 3rd between 2013 and 2015. 

In the 2015/16 season he scored 14 league goals and finished as his team’s top scorer as Be’er Sheva celebrated their first league winning campaign in 40 years. Consequently, Barda was selected as the 2015/16 player of the season in the Israeli Premier League. Barda had a less successful 2016/17 season despite scoring a few important goals, and ended the season with 5 goals. 

In November 2017, Barda suffered a heart attack during a training session. The club’s physiotherapist saved his life, but Elyaniv was forced to retire. He came on as a substitute in the 90th minute on the final day of the season, Making his last appearance ever in a 6-0 win against Maccabi Netanya that marked the end of Be’er Sheva’s 3rd consecutive title winning season.

International career
Barda scored three times in 17 matches for the Israel U21 team between 2001 and 2003. On 17 November 2007, he scored the opening goal in Israel's win against Russia, a goal that could have saved England's UEFA Euro 2008 qualifying campaign if England beat or even drew with Croatia on 21 November 2007, but England lost the match 2–3, meaning they did not qualify. On 21 November 2007, he scored his second goal for Israel in their 1–0 win against Macedonia. He made his debut for Israel on 24 March 2007 in the Euro 2008 Qualifier against England (0–0).

Managerial Career
Since joining Hapoel Be’er Sheva for the 2nd time in 2013, Barda spoke a few times about the possibility of becoming a director of football after he hangs up his boots. After his retirement, Elyaniv had various responsibilities in the club, ranging from scouting to supervising Be’er Sheva’s academy and its partnership with Atlético Madrid. Elyaniv was also an assistant coach and a caretaker manager in the 2020/2021 season. At the start of the 2021/2022 season, Barda officially became Director of Football.

After Be’er Sheva’s coach at the time, Ronny Levi, was fired he was replaced by Barda who was supposed to be a temporary manager until the end of the season. However, due to the team’s improved performance, and mostly due to winning the 2021/2022 Israeli State Cup, Barda’s job became permanent in the summer of 2022. Since then Hapoel Be’er Sheva won the 2022 Israeli Super Cup against Maccabi Haifa, who Be’er Sheva won the cup against the season prior. Barda’s Be’er Sheva also qualified for the 2022/2023 conference League group stage.

Career statistics

Club
(correct as of 9 July 2015)

International goals

Honours

Club
Maccabi Haifa
Toto Cup Top Division (1): 2002–03
Israeli Premier League (2): 2003–04, 2004–05

Hapoel Tel Aviv
Israel State Cup (2): 2005–06, 2006–07

Genk
Belgian Cup (2): 2008–09, 2012–13
Belgian Pro League (1): 2010–11
Belgian Super Cup (1): 2011

Hapoel Beer Sheva
Israeli Premier League (3): 2015–16, 2016–17 2017–18
Toto Cup Top Division (1): 2016–17

Individual
Hapoel Beer Sheva
Footballer of the Year in Israel (1): 2015–16 [1st place]
Israeli Premier League Top scorer (1): 2015–16 [2nd place]

As a Manager
Hapoel Beer Sheva
Israel State Cup (1): 2021–22

References

External links
 Elyaniv Barda profile and club history on Maccabi Haifa Official Website 
 Elyaniv Barda Profile and Statistics on One.co.il 

1981 births
Living people
Israeli footballers
Association football forwards
Footballers from Beersheba
Hapoel Be'er Sheva F.C. players
Maccabi Haifa F.C. players
Hapoel Tel Aviv F.C. players
K.R.C. Genk players
Liga Leumit players
Israeli Premier League players
Belgian Pro League players
Israel under-21 international footballers
Israel international footballers
Israeli expatriate footballers
Expatriate footballers in Belgium
Israeli expatriate sportspeople in Belgium
Israeli football managers
Hapoel Be'er Sheva F.C. managers
Israeli Premier League managers
Israeli people of Tunisian-Jewish descent
Israeli Footballer of the Year recipients